Tuffy Neugen (6 June 1899 – 4 December 1935) was a Brazilian footballer. He played in two matches for the Brazil national football team in 1925. He was also part of Brazil's squad for the 1925 South American Championship.

References

1899 births
1935 deaths
Brazilian footballers
Brazil international footballers
Association football goalkeepers
Esporte Clube Pelotas players
Santos FC players
Sociedade Esportiva Palmeiras players
Sport Club Corinthians Paulista players